The Journal of Pediatric Hematology/Oncology Nursing is a peer-reviewed nursing journal covering pediatric and oncology nursing. The editor-in-chief is Kristin Stegenga (Children's Mercy Hospital). It was established in 1985 and is  published by SAGE Publications in association with the Association of Pediatric Hematology/Oncology Nurses (APHON). The journal changed its name from Journal of Pediatric Oncology Nursing (JOPON) to Journal of Pediatric Hematology/Oncology Nursing (JOPHON) on January 1, 2022.

Abstracting and indexing 
The journal is abstracted and indexed in MEDLINE, PsycINFO, Scopus, and the Science Citation Index Expanded. According to the Journal Citation Reports, its 2020 impact factor is 1.636.

References

External links 
 
 Association of Pediatric Hematology/Oncology Nurses

SAGE Publishing academic journals
English-language journals
Bimonthly journals
Pediatric nursing journals
Oncology nursing journals